Leimuiderbrug is a hamlet in the Dutch province of North Holland. It is a part of the municipality of Haarlemmermeer, and lies about 11 km west of Amsterdam.

Leimuiderbrug has a population of around 40.

References

Populated places in North Holland
Haarlemmermeer